Gisilia gielisi is a moth in the family Cosmopterigidae. It was described by Koster in 2010. It is found in the United Arab Emirates.

References

Natural History Museum Lepidoptera generic names catalog

Moths described in 2010
Chrysopeleiinae
Moths of Asia